Pambia (Apambia) is a Zande language spoken in the northeast of the Democratic Republic of the Congo.

References

Languages of the Democratic Republic of the Congo
Zande languages